Edgewise is an hour-long television news magazine program that aired on MSNBC from 1996 to 1997. The show was hosted by John Hockenberry.

The show aired on Saturday evenings. In one notable episode with David Brinkley, the journalist was critical of President Bill Clinton. In July 1997, it was reported the show would be canceled. It ran until Labor Day of that year.

References

External links
Edgewise website via Internet Archive

MSNBC original programming
1996 American television series debuts
1997 American television series endings
1990s American television news shows
English-language television shows